The gray smooth-hound (Mustelus californicus) is a houndshark of the family Triakidae. It is found on the continental shelves of the subtropical eastern Pacific, from northern California to the Gulf of California, between latitudes 40° N and 23° N, to a depth of 46 m. It can grow up to a length of 1.24 m.

References

 
 
 Compagno, Dando, & Fowler, Sharks, Collins Gem, HarperCollins, London (2006) 

gray smooth-hound
Fauna of the Baja California Peninsula
Fish of the Gulf of California
gray smooth-hound
gray smooth-hound